Groningen–Münster was a single-day road cycling race held from 2000 to 2004, which was contested between the cities of Groningen, the Netherlands, and Münster, Germany.

Winners

References

Cycle races in Germany
Cycle races in the Netherlands
Recurring sporting events established in 2000
Recurring sporting events disestablished in 2004
Defunct cycling races in Germany
Defunct cycling races in the Netherlands